Paul Jubb (born 31 October 1999) is a British tennis player. Jubb has a career high Association of Tennis Professionals (ATP) singles ranking of 196, which he achieved on the 12th of September 2022.

Early years
At the age of four Jubb was spotted playing tennis at Pelican Park near his home in Hull. He was spotted by tennis coach Jonny Carmichael. Carmichael coached Jubb into his teenage years where he trained at the LTA-accredited Nuffield Health Tennis Academy in Hull.

In 2015 he won the under 16 Boys singles title at the LTA British Nationals.

Professional career
Jubb made his Grand Slam main draw debut at the 2019 Wimbledon Championships after receiving a wildcard for the singles main draw, but dropped out in the first round after losing in 4 sets to João Sousa. 

He made his ATP Tour debut at the 2019 Eastbourne International by winning two qualifying matches, before losing in the first round to eventual champion Taylor Fritz. Jubb won the singles title at the 2019 NCAA Division I Men's Tennis Championship as a member of the South Carolina Gamecocks.

Jubb lost in five sets to eventual finalist Nick Kyrgios in the first round of the 2022 Wimbledon championship.

Career finals

Singles: 9 (8–1)

References

External links

1999 births
Living people
British male tennis players
Sportspeople from Kingston upon Hull
South Carolina Gamecocks men's tennis players
Black British sportspeople
English people of Jamaican descent
Tennis people from the East Riding of Yorkshire
English male tennis players